Interdigital webbing is the presence of membranes of skin between the digits. Normally in mammals, webbing is present in the embryo but resorbed later in development, but in various mammal species it occasionally persists in adulthood. In humans, it can be found in those suffering from LEOPARD syndrome and from Aarskog–Scott syndrome.

Webbing between the digits of the hindfoot is also present in several mammals that spend part of their time in the water. Webbing accommodates movement in the water.

Interdigital webbing is not to be confused with syndactyly, which is a fusing of digits and occurs rarely in humans. Syndactyly specifically affecting feet occurs in birds (such as ducks), amphibians (such as frogs), and mammals (such as the kangaroo).

Mammals with interdigital webbing

Rodents

In oryzomyines, a mainly South American rodent group, the marsh rice rat, Pseudoryzomys simplex, and Sigmodontomys alfari all have small webs, which do not extend to the end of the proximal phalanges, whereas Amphinectomys savamis, Lundomys molitor and the members of the genera Holochilus and Nectomys have more expansive webbing, which extends beyond the proximal phalanges. Webbing apparently developed several times in oryzomyines and may also have been lost in some groups. Most ichthyomyines, an exclusively semiaquatic South and Central American rodent group, have small webbing, but members of the genus Rheomys have more expansive webs. Webbing is also present in the Australasian semiaquatic hydromyines (subfamily Murinae) of the genera Baiyankamys, Hydromys, and Crossomys; in the latter, it is most well-developed. The African semiaquatic rodents Colomys goslingi and Nilopegamys plumbeus, also members of the Murinae, lack interdigital webbing. Webbing is present in the hind feet of the coypu (Myocastor coypus) of South America, which is currently classified in its own family.

Soricomorphs
Among shrews, the members of the genera Chimarrogale of southeastern Asia and Neomys of western Eurasia have interdigital webbing, as does the American water shrew (Sorex palustris) of North America, but it is more well-developed in Nectogale elegans of montane Asia. Webbing is also present in the Pyrenean desman (Galemys pyrenaicus).

Tenrecs
The tenrec family, which occurs in Africa and mainly on Madagascar, includes several semiaquatic forms, and the small otter-shrews (Micropotamogale) and the aptly named web-footed tenrec (Limnogale mergulus) have developed interdigital webbing.

Opossums
The water opossum (Chironectes minimus) of South America is the only opossum with interdigital webbing.

Carnivorans

Several semiaquatic carnivorans have interdigital webbing, including the greater grison (Galictis vittata), the Colombian weasel (Neogale felipei), the Amazon weasel (Neogale africana), and the American mink (Neogale vison).

All otters have interdigital webbing, in the fore or hind limbs or both, to aid in aquatic propulsion. In sea otters, the webbing is covered with hair, at a density of 3300 hairs per square centimeter.

Whales
Pits present on the sides of fossil proximal phalanges of pakicetids, ancestral whales, suggest that these animals had interdigital webbing, a development hypothesized to lead to the fluke, spurred by FGF8, a fibroblast growth factor.

Citations

Literature cited
 Braun, J.K. and Díaz, M.M. 1999. Key to the native mammals of Catamarca Province, Argentina. Occasional papers of the Oklahoma Museum of Natural History 4:1–16.
 Cooper, L.N., and J.G.M. Thewissen. 2009 The role of FGF-8 in the origin of interdigital webbing in cetaceans. Presentation, Society of Integrative and Comparative Biology, Boston, Massachusetts.
 Fish, Frank E. Biomechanical Perspective on the Origin of Cetacean Flukes. J. G. M. Thewissen, ed. The emergence of whales: evolutionary patterns in the origin of Cetacea. Springer, 1998. . 303-24.
 
 
 
 
 
 Rumbaugh, D.M. and Chiarelli, A.B. 1972. Evolution, ecology, behavior, and captive maintenance. S. Karger, 263 pp. 
 Tate, G.H.H. 1951. The rodents of Australia and New Guinea. Bulletin of the American Museum of Natural History 97:187–430.
 Voss, R.S. 1988. Systematics and ecology of ichthyomyine rodents (Muroidea) : patterns of morphological evolution in a small adaptive radiation. Bulletin of the American Museum of Natural History 188:260–493.
 Voss, R.S. and Jansa, S.A. 2009. Phylogenetic relationships and classification of didelphid marsupials, an extant radiation of New World metatherian mammals. Bulletin of the American Museum of Natural History 322:1–177.
 Weksler, M. 2006. Phylogenetic relationships of oryzomyine rodents (Muroidea: Sigmodontinae): separate and combined analyses of morphological and molecular data. Bulletin of the American Museum of Natural History 296:1–149.
 

Mammal anatomy